Dizaj-e Malek (also Romanized as Dīzaj-e Malek and Dīzaj Malek; also known as Diza, Dīzaj, and Dīzeh) is a village in Ozomdel-e Jonubi Rural District, in the Central District of Varzaqan County, East Azerbaijan Province, Iran. At the 2006 census, its population was 1,123, in 238 families.

References 

Towns and villages in Varzaqan County